Brassia gireoudiana, or Gireoud's brassia, is a species of orchid. It is native to Costa Rica and Panama.

References

gireoudiana
Orchids of Costa Rica
Orchids of Panama